Axel Frische (15 March 1877 – 2 February 1956) was a Danish screenwriter, actor and film director. He wrote for 23 films between 1914 and 1956. He also appeared in 18 films between 1932 and 1950. He was born and died in Denmark.

Selected filmography
 The Price of Betrayal (1915)
 Odds 777 (1932)
 Life on the Hegn Farm (1938)
 Blaavand melder storm (1938)
 Familien Olsen (1940)
 Far skal giftes (1941 - writer)
 Moster fra Mols (1943 - writer and director)
 Letter from the Dead (1946)
 We Meet at Tove's (1946)
 The Viking Watch of the Danish Seaman (1948)
 Mosekongen (1950)

References

External links

1877 births
1956 deaths
Danish male screenwriters
Danish male film actors
Danish male silent film actors
20th-century Danish male actors
Danish film directors
20th-century screenwriters